The Madras Pioneer is a weekly paper published in Madras, Oregon, United States, since 1904. It is published on Wednesdays and has a circulation of 3,885. It is the newspaper of record for Jefferson County. The paper was once owned by Oregon governor Elmo Smith, whose family still owns Eagle Newspapers. In January 2013, the paper was sold to the Pamplin Media Group along with five other papers owned by Eagle Newspapers.

References

External links

Madras, Oregon
1904 establishments in Oregon
Newspapers published by Pamplin Media Group
Oregon Newspaper Publishers Association
Publications established in 1904
Weekly newspapers published in the United States
Newspapers published in Oregon